Howkins is a surname. Notable people with the surname include:

Alun Howkins (1947–2018), English social historian
John Howkins (born 1945), British writer
John Howkins (civil engineer) (1839–1906), Scottish civil engineer
Kyle Howkins (born 1996), English footballer
Mark Howkins (born 1953), Canadian sport shooter

See also
Howkins Inlet, an inlet of Palmer Land, Antarctica